Noise Pop is an independent music promoter established in San Francisco in 1993. Noise Pop's namesake festival, the Noise Pop Festival, has featured artists such as White Stripes, Modest Mouse, Death Cab for Cutie, The Flaming Lips, The Shins, Fleet Foxes, Bright Eyes and Yoko Ono.

Noise Pop also co-produces Treasure Island Music Festival. The outdoor festival, established in 2007, took place in the middle of the San Francisco Bay until 2016. Hosting 18,000 attendees per day, Treasure Island has featured Outkast, Beck, Atoms for Peace, LCD Soundsystem, Deadmau5, Public Enemy, and The National. The new location for 2018 is at Middle Harbor Shoreline Park in Oakland.

It is the year-round talent buyer for the San Francisco venue Swedish American Hall and Cafe du Nord. It produces the free celebration of musical and culinary programming, the 20th Street Block Party.

Additionally, they partner with various organizations, venues, and institutions to produce events throughout the year including the SFMOMA, California Sunday Magazine and the California Academy of Sciences.

Festivals

Noise Pop Festival 
Noise Pop Festival began in 1993 as a "5 bands for 5 dollars show" at the Kennel Club (now the Independent). Tickets were $5 and although it was only one day, it was called the S.F. Noise Pop Festival. It has expanded to a week-long festival across many Bay Area venues.

Treasure Island Music Festival 
In 2007 Noise Pop partnered with Bay Area promoter Another Planet Entertainment to produce the first annual Treasure Island Music Festival. The inaugural edition of the festival was headlined by Modest Mouse and Thievery Corporation. It had been held on the actual Treasure Island off the coast of San Francisco until 2016. The new location for 2018 is at Middle Harbor Shoreline Park in Oakland.

The lineup typically features indie and electronic music. Past headliners include Outkast, LCD Soundsystem, The National, Beck, and the XX. Other highlights include a large ferris wheel, art exhibits, and no overlapping sets.

Subsidiaries and venues

DoTheBay 
Acquired by Noise Pop in 2012, DoTheBay is an entertainment website based in the San Francisco-Bay Area that acts as a place for users to find out about upcoming events. DoTheBay is a part of the DoStuff Network, a network of 14 scene-level culture and event guides helping people connect to events across North America. DoStuff Media originated in Austin, Texas, in 2006.

Swedish American Music Hall and Cafe du Nord 
In December 2014, Noise Pop announced it would reopen the Swedish American Music Hall and become the curator for live events. Since taking over the booking they have hosted artists such as Tokimonsta, The Mountain Goats, and Kero Kero Bonito.

In May 2017, it was announced Cafe du Nord would reopen as a music venue. Rogue Wave played their opening night on June 1, 2017.

References

External links 
 20th Street Block Party

Music promoters
Indie rock
Music of the San Francisco Bay Area
1993 establishments in California
Companies based in San Francisco